The 1975 NASCAR Grand National Winston Cup Series was the 27th season of professional stock car racing in the United States and the 4th season in the modern era of the NASCAR Cup series. The season began on Sunday, January 19 and ended on Sunday, November 12. Richard Petty, driving the #43 Petty Enterprises STP Dodge scored his sixth NASCAR Grand National Series Winston Cup Championship. Bruce Hill was named NASCAR Rookie of the Year. NASCAR introduced a new points system for 1975, a system designed by statistician Bob Latford. For the first time, each race on the NASCAR Winston Cup Grand National schedule carried an equal point value, a system that would be used for 36 seasons, from 1975 to 2010. The original points system ran for the first 29 seasons, from 1975 to 2003.

Richard Petty's championship would also be the last for a Dodge driver until Brad Keselowski in 2012.

Season recap

1975 Season races

Round 1: Winston Western 500 
Bobby Allison led 173 laps at Riverside International Raceway in Roger Penske's AMC Matador to beat David Pearson by 22 seconds.

Round 2: Daytona 500 
After falling back several laps due to overheating, Richard Petty pulled forward Benny Parsons in his draft to catch Pearson.   With three to go Pearson moved into a group of lapped cars that included Cale Yarborough; inexplicably Yarborough got into Pearson and David spun down the backstretch.  The win was Parsons' first since 1973.

Round 3: Richmond 500 
With a field of only 22 entries due to a dearth of team sponsorships, Petty led 444 laps and won by six laps.  Cale Yarborough was among the teams not entered, due to losing Carling sponsorship after the 1974 season.

Round 4: Carolina 500 
The 1975 Carolina 500 was run on March 2. In below-freezing temperatures, Cale Yarborough edged Pearson for the win while Petty finished nine laps down due to the same overheating problems that had plagued him at Daytona.

Round 5: Southeastern 500 
Richard Petty won his first race at Bristol International Speedway since 1967.  Cale Yarborough led 78 laps but fell out with rearend failure.  Following the race Maurice Petty found out the team's overheating problems traced to cracked cylinder heads; "we discovered another cracked head that could have cost us the race."

Round 6: Atlanta 500 
With Maurice fixing the team's cylinder head issues, Richard Petty engaged Pearson in a running duel for the lead, but Pearson lost a lap in the final 30 laps, result of a slow leaking tire and resultant green flag stop.   A late caution for Lennie Pond's engine failure set up a one-lap duel between Petty and Buddy Baker; Petty contended the race ran past 328 laps, a statement supported by his official scorer (Richard Hucks) and the scorers for Pearson (Grover Atkins) and Dick Brooks (Russell Page), but NASCAR showed scoring cards proving it had run the correct distance; among those who scored the race was Richard's daughter Sharon, who said Petty "went by 328 times."  Manual scoring with cards and a clock created controversy over the years in NASCAR;  the system was used until 1993, when NASCAR switched to electronic scoring.

Round 7: Gwyn Staley 400 
The 1975 Gwyn Staley 400 took place on April 6 at North Wilkesboro Speedway.The race was dominated by Richard Petty, who led a total of 311 laps and won by a margin of over three laps.

Round 8: Rebel 500 
Darlington Raceway once again proved tougher than Richard Petty as the #43 Dodge crashed out after 159 laps.   Benny Parsons and David Pearson got into the late duel for the lead; when Pearson dove under Parsons entering Turn One on lap 350 both cars hammered the wall and ground to a halt.  Bobby Allison, who'd been two laps down earlier, unlapped himself and edged Darrell Waltrip and Donnie Allison nose to tail at the stripe.

Round 9: Virginia 500 
The 1975 Virginia 500 was run on April 27 at Martinsville Speedway. The race saw Richard Petty, Darrell Waltrip, and Cale Yarborough battle in out for the lead in the closing stages of the race. At lap 397, Yarborough would fall back and lose the lead to Petty, leading to Darrell and Richard to battle it out. Darrell would take the lead on lap 452, but on lap 480 Petty would retake the lead and lead the rest of the remaining laps that day to win by 6 seconds

Round 10: Winston 500 
Tragedy blackened Buddy Baker's first win since 1973 and the first win for team owner Bud Moore since 1966.  Richard Petty's wheel well caught fire while leading and he pitted; his brother in law Randy Owens fitted a hose to a pressurized water tank; the tank exploded, nearly landing on Petty's roof, and Owens was killed.   Baker edged Pearson at the stripe while Dick Brooks and Darrell Waltrip had sparkling efforts in finishing out the top four.   The race lead changed 51 times among 13 drivers.

Round 11: Music City 420 
The Music City 420 took place on May 10 at Nashville Speedway. The race had two contenders: Darrell Waltrip and Cale Yarborough. Darrell had the pole and led 47 laps before Cale took it away on lap 48. He then proceeded to lead the next 273 laps, with Darrell behind. However, Cale's car proceeded to have engine problems and retired on lap 322, thus handing the lead back over to Darrell. Darrell, who had a 2 lap lead on the next car behind, Benny Parsons, cruised on to a victory.

Round 12: Mason-Dixon 500 
The 1975 Mason Dixon 500 took place on May 18 at Dover Downs International Speedway. Once again, the race had two contenders; David Pearson and Benny Parsons. In the middle parts of the race, they would swap the lead with each other frequently. However, Parsons would have to retire at lap 360 due to engine problems. David Pearson cruised to a 7 lap margin victory over Cecil Gordon.

Round 13: World 600 
Petty won a long-distance race at Charlotte Motor Speedway for the first time in his career (he'd won a 100-mile qualifying race there in 1961) as he led 234 laps and finished a lap ahead of Cale Yarborough.  The Junior Johnson team by this point had secured Holly Farms sponsorship, allowing the team to contest the remainder of the season. Future seven-time champion Dale Earnhardt made his Cup debut in this race.

Round 14: Tuborg 400

Round 15: Michigan 400 
In a highly competitive race that saw 44 lead changes, Pearson edged Petty for his second win of the season while Dave Marcis and Cale Yarborough finished third and fourth; the top four combined to lead 180 of 200 laps.  Petty increased his point lead to 441 over Marcis.

Round 16: Firecracker 400 
Petty struggled during the weekend, qualifying only at 180 MPH but drafted past Buddy Baker with thirteen laps to go. Donnie Allison finished a distant fifth after winning the pole and was released from the DiGard Racing team and replaced by Darrell Waltrip, who finished fourth.

Round 17: Nashville 420 

The 1975 Nashville 420 took place on July 20 at Nashville Speedway. Cale Yarborough dominated the race after passing Walter Ballard on lap 50, leading the rest of the laps afterwards and winning.

Round 18: Purolator 500 
Controversy marred the finish. The lead changed 43 times despite a ninety-minute delay for rain near halfway.  Pearson took the lead with 14 to go, but in the final seven laps the Wood Brothers Mercury smoked heavily, to where by Lap 198 it was lapping its own smoke.   At that point NASCAR black-flagged Pearson, but the rules allowed a three lap period to obey the flag and there were only two laps to go.  It was the third win of the season for Pearson.  Under current NASCAR rules with electronic scoring, a time or lap penalty would be added for late-race black flag penalties.

Round 19: Talladega 500 
Multiple tragedies surrounded the seventh running of NASCAR's late-summer 500-miler at Talladega.  Gene Lovell, crew chief for Grant Adcox, died of a heart attack; Adcox withdrew and first alternate Tiny Lund got his starting spot.  Mark Donohue drove a Porsche IMSA racer to a new closed-course speed record of 221 MPH (breaking A. J. Foyt's  217 MPH record in his Indycar the previous year) before pole qualifying; Donohue was killed ten days later during the Austrian Grand Prix.  The 500 itself was scheduled for August 10 but was rained out until the 17th.  Early in the race a six-car melee erupted and Lund was smashed through the driver side by another car; he succumbed to massive internal injuries.  Dick Brooks then survived a furious tumble down the backstretch in the middle of the race.   Buddy Baker held off Richard Petty at the stripe after 60 lead changes among 17 drivers.

Round 20: Champion Spark Plug 400 
A six-car crash pierced the backstretch guardrail and stopped the race for half an hour.   A late caution set off a five-lap shootout as Petty and Pearson fought for the lead; the lead changed on every lap before Petty drafted past Pearson for the win. Cale Yarborough survived a spin after colliding with Dave Marcis and finished third; the two exchanged words after the race.

Round 21: Southern 500 
Bobby Allison, despite breaking a suspension piece in the final 50 laps, completed a season sweep at Darlington as he outlasted Richard Petty, who competed despite illness and heat, needing relief help from Dave Marcis.

Round 22: Delaware 500 
Petty put the entire field two laps down, but with 150 to go a backmarker's blown engine sent debris under the STP Dodge and snapped a tie rod.   Petty's crew needed eight laps to fix the problem and he restarted six laps behind Lennie Pond and Cale Yarborough.  Pond fell out and Cale fell back; Petty kept lapping the field until he got back onto the lead lap; Buddy Arrington then came to a stop, necessitating a late yellow.   Petty won handily and Dick Brooks finished second, upset because Arrington had purchased a transporter from Petty; said Brooks, "I guess Arrington needed that truck paid for."

Round 23: Wilkes 400

Round 24: Old Dominion 500 
Richard Petty fell out with rearend failure and pole-sitter Cale Yarborough crashed after leading 272 laps.  Darrell Waltrip led before blowing his engine and Dave Marcis took the win, his first Winston Cup win and the first for Harry Hyde's #71 Dodge since 1973.

Round 25: National 500 
Richard Petty broke out of a tight battle and led the final 111 laps for the sweep at Charlotte Motor Speedway.  The win all but clinched his sixth Winston Cup Grand National title.

Round 26: Capital City 500 
Richard Petty broke a piston 34 laps in but still clinched his sixth title; the Petty Enterprises team had begun experimenting with new parts in anticipation of the 1976 season.  Darrell Waltrip made up two laps to post his second win of 1975 and the first for DiGard Racing.

Round 27: American 500

Round 28: Volunteer 500

Round 29: Dixie 500

Round 30: Los Angeles Times 500 
Buddy Baker initially was not entered in NASCAR's season finale but Bud Moore had secured sponsorship from Norris Industries so Baker flew out to LA and led 148 laps, winning by 30 seconds over Pearson.   Richard Petty led but fell out for the second straight year with engine failure; it was also his fourth DNF in his last seven races.

Full Drivers’ Championship

(key) Bold – Pole position awarded by time. Italics – Pole position set by owner's points. * – Most laps led.

See also
 NASCAR Goes Country

References

External links 
 1975 NASCAR Winston Cup Series results on Racing-Reference

 
Winston Cup Series
NASCAR Cup Series seasons